The Asian Super Cup was an annual football competition between the winners of the Asian Club Championship and the Asian Cup Winners' Cup.

The competition started in 1995, but came to an end in 2002 after both major AFC tournaments were merged into the AFC Champions League. The most successful clubs in the competition are Al-Hilal of Saudi Arabia and Suwon Samsung Bluewings of South Korea.

Finals

Records and statistics

By club

The following table lists clubs by number of winners and runners-up in Asian Super Cup.

By country

The following table lists countries by number of winners and runners-up in Asian Super Cup.

By representative

By winning coaches
The following table lists the winning coaches of the Asian Super Cup.

External links
 RSSSF – Asian Super Cup

 
Defunct Asian Football Confederation club competitions
Recurring sporting events established in 1995
Recurring sporting events disestablished in 2002